Bill Becher (born 15 February 1965) is a former American soccer player and head coach.

Player

Youth
Born in West Virginia, Becher grew up in St. Louis. He began his collegiate career at Lewis and Clark Community College. He then transferred to Sangamon State University. In 1986, Becher was a Third Team NAIA All American. In 1987, he scored the winning goal as Sangamon won the NAIA national men's soccer championship and Becher was named the tournament MVP.

Professional
In 1987, Becher turned professional with the Fort Wayne Flames of the American Indoor Soccer Association. He played two season with the Flames.  When the Flames folded in 1989, Becher moved to the newly created Indiana Kick. In 1990, the Kick moved to New York to become the New York Kick. Becher began the 1990-1991 AISA season with the Kick, but left the team in January 1991 after the team cut salaries.  In 1991, Becher played for the Colorado Foxes in the American Professional Soccer League.  In 1993 and 1994, Becher played summer seasons with the Arizona Sandsharks of the Continental Indoor Soccer League. On October 22, 1999, the Heat traded Becher to the St. Louis Ambush for undisclosed considerations.  He spent one season with the Ambush, then retired from professional soccer. He also played for the Hershey Impact.

Statistics

Coach

Honors
2005 United Soccer Leagues Coach of the Year
2007 USL Second Division Championship
2011 USL Pro Finalist
2014 USL Pro Finalist

References

1965 births
Living people
American Indoor Soccer Association players
American soccer players
American Professional Soccer League players
Arizona Sandsharks players
Colorado Foxes players
Continental Indoor Soccer League players
Fort Wayne Flames players
Indiana Kick players
National Professional Soccer League (1984–2001) players
New York Kick players
Sportspeople from Wheeling, West Virginia
Soccer players from St. Louis
St. Louis Ambush (1992–2000) players
Penn FC coaches
Association football midfielders
American soccer coaches
Harrisburg Heat (NPSL) players
USL Championship coaches
UIS Prairie Stars
University of Illinois at Springfield alumni